A Profound Hatred of Man is an extended play by hardcore punk band Shai Hulud, released on February 18, 1997, on the independent label Crisis Records. In 2006, Revelation Records released a remastered version of the album which also includes the material from all of Shai Hulud's split records with bands Indecision, Boy Sets Fire and Another Victim, and some B-sides and covers.

On the first 5000 copies, Shai Hulud's name is misspelled on the spine as "Shai Halud", but appears correctly on the cover.

In "If Born From This Soil", the lyric "A likeness only in structure, not in mind" came into his mind when an impatient, drunk man spoke for Matt Fox, while he was waiting in a long line at a gas station. The man said to the cashier while gesturing to himself and Matt, "We just want a beer." The sample at the beginning of the song is Al Pacino in Glengarry Glen Ross (1992). Some other samples played are Kurt Russell in The Thing (1982) in "The Bonds of Those Who Have No Understanding of Consequences" ("Trust is a tough thing to come by these days.") and Siân Phillips in Dune (1984) in "Set Your Body Ablaze" ("Heat, upon heat, upon heat.")

Track listing
Credits are adapted from the album's liner notes.

Credits
Original 1997 line-up:
 Chad Gilbert – vocals
 Matt Fox – guitar
 Oliver Chapoy – guitar
 Dave Silber – bass guitar
 Steve Kleisath – drums

Compilation songs:
 Geert Van Der Velde – vocals
 Matthew Fletcher – guitar, bass guitar
 Jared Allen – bass guitar
 Spikey Goldbach – drums
 Damien Moyal – lyrics

References 

Shai Hulud albums
2006 compilation albums
1997 EPs
Revelation Records EPs